Whispering Smith is a 1948 American Western film directed by Leslie Fenton and starring Alan Ladd as a railroad detective assigned to stop a gang of train robbers. The supporting cast includes Robert Preston, Brenda Marshall and Donald Crisp.

The picture is based on a novel by Frank H. Spearman and a previous 1926 film adaptation starring H. B. Warner.

Plot
The bad Barton boys—Blake, Leroy, and Gabby—rob a train and shoot a guard. Luke Smith, known as "Whispering" to some for his quiet ways, is a detective for the railroad sent to investigate.

Murray Sinclair, an old friend of Smith's, is in charge of the railroad's wrecking crew. He's glad to see Smith, who shoots Leroy and Gabby and is saved when a bullet is deflected by a harmonica in his pocket, given him long ago by his sweetheart Marian, who is now Sinclair's wife.

It saddens Smith to find out that Sinclair might be in cahoots with Barney Rebstock, a rancher with a bad reputation. Rebstock has been hiding the remaining Barton brother, Blake, who is tracked down by Smith.

Whitey DuSang is a hired gun for Rebstock, who wants to see Smith dead. When the railroad's boss gives Sinclair an order, Sinclair rebels and is fired. Rebstock hires him to pull off a string of daring train holdups.

Smith forms a posse. Whitey kills a guard and betrays Rebstock, shooting him. Sinclair is wounded. Smith does away with Whitey but gives his old friend Sinclair a last chance. When Sinclair rides home, he finds Marian packing and strikes her, accusing her of leaving him for Smith.

Smith shows up and Sinclair apologises for his actions. He seems sincere, but when Smith's back is turned, Sinclair pulls a hidden gun. Before he can fire, Sinclair falls over and dies from his wound. Smith leaves town, his work there done.

Cast
 Alan Ladd as Whispering Smith
 Robert Preston as Murray Sinclair
 Brenda Marshall as Marian Sinclair
 Donald Crisp as Barney Rebstock
 William Demarest as Bill Dansing 
 Fay Holden as Emmy Dansing
 Murvyn Vye as Blake Barton
 Frank Faylen as Whitey Du Sang
 John Eldredge as George McCloud
 Ward Wood as Leroy Barton (as Robert Wood)
 J. Farrell MacDonald as Bill Baggs
 Will Wright as Sheriff McSwiggin
 Don Barclay as Dr. Sawbuck
 Eddy Waller as Conductor (as Eddy Waller)
 Ashley Cowan as Brakeman
 Jimmie Dundee as Karg
 Ray Teal as Seagrue
 Bob Kortman as Gabby Barton

Production
The film was announced in early 1947 as a vehicle for Alan Ladd. It was Ladd's first Western and his first movie in colour.

The script made a number of changes to the original novel including changing the double love story to one.

Brenda Marshall was given her first screen role in four years. Filming began on 14 April 1947.

The role of Whispering Smith was partly based on Jake Lefors. The part of Murray Sinclair, Smith's friend who turns to crime, was supposedly inspired by Butch Cassidy.

The filmmakers built a Western town on five acres of the backlot at a cost of $70,000. It included 2000 feet of railroad track on which authentic 1870 locomotives owned by Paramount were operated. The trains were converted from their original wood-burning fuel system to oil by their original owner, the Virginia & Truckee Railroad of Carson City, Nevada.The set was later re-used in many later TV shows and films, including Bonanza.

Reception
The film was not released until 1949, by which time Paramount had made and released another Ladd film, Beyond Glory.

The film was popular with audiences. According to Variety it was the 20th-most popular film in the US and Canada in 1949. It was also one of the most watched films of the year in the UK.

Possible follow up
Sol Lesser, who had rights to ten Whispering Smith stories, wanted to film some of them with Robert Mitchum, who had begun his career as a leading man in a pair of Zane Grey Westerns. These films were not made. However, Audie Murphy later starred in a Whispering Smith TV series.

References

External links
 
 
 

1948 films
1940s historical films
1948 Western (genre) films
American historical films
American Western (genre) films
Films scored by Adolph Deutsch
Films based on American novels
Films based on Western (genre) novels
Films directed by Leslie Fenton
Paramount Pictures films
Rail transport films
1940s English-language films
1940s American films